Information Technologies & International Development (ITID) is an open access print and online peer-reviewed academic journal covering studies on communication and international development, published quarterly by the USC Annenberg Press (University of Southern California). The journal was established in 2003 and is indexed by EBSCOhost, ProQuest, Genamics Journal Seek, the International Development Informatics Association, and the International Network for Post Graduate Students in the Area of ICT4D (IPID).

ITID focuses on the study of the relationship between information and communication technologies and economic and social development, inviting submissions from engineers, social scientists, policy makers, development specialists, and scholars of diverse academic backgrounds. According to a recent study, ITID is ranked as the top journal for research impact in the Information and communication technologies for development (ICT4D) field.

References

External links 

 
 

Media studies journals
Development studies
University of Southern California
Publications established in 2003
English-language journals
Development studies journals